The X-Corps is a fictional team appearing in American comic books published by Marvel Comics. Whether they were good or bad was left up to debate, even within the X-Men, but the team acted as a mutant police force created by former X-Man Banshee, in The Uncanny X-Men #401 (Jan. 2002). The team concept was created by Joe Casey and Ron Garney.

History

Background
Sean Cassidy (also known as Banshee) was a broken man. After the death of Moira MacTaggert—long-term ally of the X-Men and former lover of Banshee—and the closing of the Massachusetts Academy, home to Generation X for which he was a former headmaster of the group, he felt he had failed at everything in his life. He began to reevaluate the things in his life, and among those things was Charles Xavier's dream of peaceful coexistence between humans and mutants. In all his years of fighting alongside the X-Men, was there any real change that was enacted? With that thought, Banshee began to re-envision Xavier's dream in a daring new way: why not use mutants as a police force to regulate the activity of other mutants instead of waiting for a crisis to arise? With an abandoned A.I.M. facility, his links to Interpol, and the help of some of his former friends and pupils Banshee created the X-Corps. The force's goal was to police the mutant population in Europe.

Along with Multiple Man, his former students Husk, Jubilee, and M, former Alpha Flight member Radius, and one-time interim X-Men member Sunpyre, he formed the basis of his group.  However, the distinct element that separated this group from other X-Men teams, was the inclusion of known terrorists, such as Avalanche, Blob, and later Fever Pitch. Originally, Banshee kept these supervillains in line, with the help of Mastermind. Banshee had captured her and manipulated her illusionary powers to keep the villains under his control. Also as a "guest" was the enigmatic Abyss, who was being studied by Sunpyre.

Exploits
The X-Corps didn't operate as a long term group. The team recruits Mystique, who was posing as a potential new member named Surge. Because of her shapeshifting abilities, Mystique is able to move secretly around the headquarters and she stumbles upon the captive Mastermind and allies herself with the entrapped woman. Together, they are able to free the minds of the villainous X-Corps members, as well as control several duplicates of Multiple Man, and use them in an assault on Paris. In the name of mutant superiority, the group incurs some massive damage to the city including the destruction of the Eiffel Tower. Thankfully, the X-Men, along with the heroic members of the X-Corps, are able to put an end to their rampage across the city.

Aftermath
Unfortunately, there are several casualties of the battles.  The villainous Avalanche opens up the ground beneath Radius, seemingly killing him, though it is later revealed that his force field saved him. Sunpyre, acting as the group scientist, is brutally murdered by Mystique during her ascent to power. Even Banshee is incapacitated as Mystique stabs a knife through his throat, the source of his sonic powers. Finally, Mystique is sucked into the interdimensional void of Abyss, not to be seen for several months.

With the injuries sustained by Banshee and the damage to the city of Paris, the group was shut down, while some of their remaining resources and members—such as Multiple Man and M—were moved to the Paris branch of Xavier's X-Corporation.

Members
 Abyss
 Avalanche
 Banshee
 Blob
 Fever Pitch
 Husk
 Jubilee
 M
 Mastermind (Martinique Jason)
 Multiple Man
 Radius
 Sunpyre
 Surge (Mystique)

Notes
Blob carried on his usual criminal activities and sought the help of Dr. Sean Garrison to deal with his self-esteem issues. He also has been left powerless in the wake of Decimation. He appeared in the miniseries Generation M.
Fever Pitch has been seen on the grounds of the Xavier Institute as one of the 198. Sided with the forces of Apocalypse in an attack against the mansion. Killed when kidnapped by Bastion and infected with the Legacy Virus.
Husk temporarily joined the X-Men where she began a romantic relationship with Archangel which produced quite a fuss due to their age differences. Remained a reserve and was seen helping the X-Men during the Secret Invasion attack on San Francisco. Part of a task force assembled by Rogue to combat the resurrected Proteus, during which he seemingly unlocked previously unknown abilities in Husk's powers, like assuming a flaming form. She is currently a resident of the newfound "Jean Grey Institute for Higher Learning", founded by X-Man Wolverine.
Jubilee's whereabouts were unknown (probably, spending time with Skin) until she appeared crucified one morning on the lawn of the X-Mansion, along with several other people by the Church of Humanity.  Because of Archangel's healing blood, she was one of the lucky ones who were saved.  After that she also temporarily rejoined the X-Men.  However, in the wake of Decimation she has been left powerless. She appears in New Warriors using the codename Wondra. Recently infected as a vampire in an attempt to draw Wolverine in to the vampire ranks.
Multiple Man currently appears in the X-Factor series.  Along with M, Rictor, Longshot, Strong Guy, Darwin, and Siryn, who is pregnant with his child. They make up a private investigative group called X-Factor Investigations that has recently moved from Mutant Town to Detroit. Maddrox also secretly works for Val Cooper.
Mystique was later discovered to have been transported to a parallel dimension that housed her one-time former lover and father of Nightcrawler, Azazel.  That story unfolds in Uncanny X-Men #429-434, where Abyss also makes his reappearance and it is revealed that he and Nightcrawler are half-brothers. Was placed on Osborn's X-Men team, masquerading as Professor X and later Jean Grey. After Osborn's fall, she has briefly resurfaced in San Francisco, where she has tried to eliminate the mutant Wolverine.
After her apparent death, Sunpyre was mysteriously resurrected in Alpha Flight vol. 3, #9 and took her brother Sunfire's place among the Japanese group Big Hero 6. However, it was revealed in the Official Handbook of the Marvel Universe: Teams 2005 that this was a Sunpyre of an alternate Earth, summoned by Big Hero 6 member Honey Lemon.

Bibliography
 The Uncanny X-Men #401-406 (Jan. 2002-June 2002)

External links
 Uncannyxmen.net feature on X-Corps

Fictional organizations in Marvel Comics
X-Men supporting characters